Lalita Panyopas (nickname Mew, born October 5, 1971) is a Thai film and television actress. She is best known in Thailand for her roles in lakorn (soap operas).

Biography 
She made a string of feature films in the late 1980s and also was the lead actress in many Thai soap in the late 1980s to early 2000s. Her most prominent film role was as Tum, the unlucky central character in Pen-Ek Ratanaruang's 1999 film Ruang Talok 69. In 2007, she was reunited with Pen-Ek, starring in Ploy, which was screened in the Director's Fortnight at the 2007 Cannes Film Festival.

Personal life 
She received higher education at Triam Udom Suksa School and a bachelor's degree from the Faculty of Education, Srinakharinwirot University. She has a master's degree in interior design from University of Middlesex, United Kingdom.

Panyopas is married to a police officer of the Royal Thai Police named Narabadi Sasiprapha. They have two children, both boys, Sasidej (Plankton) and Sakdidej (Eton) Sasiprapha.

A funny story about 6 and 9 (1999)
Ploy (2007)

Television

External links

Lalita Panyopas at the Thai Film Database

1971 births
Living people
Lalita Panyopas
Lalita Panyopas
Lalita Panyopas
Lalita Panyopas
Lalita Panyopas
Lalita Panyopas
Lalita Panyopas